Cécile Goldet (15 March 1914 – 27 October 2019) was a French physician and politician, who served as a member of the Senate, representing Paris from 1979 to 1984, succeeding , who died in office.

References

1914 births
2019 deaths
20th-century French politicians
French Senators of the Fifth Republic
Senators of Paris
20th-century French physicians
French women physicians
20th-century French women politicians
Women members of the Senate (France)
Socialist Party (France) politicians
20th-century women physicians
French centenarians
Women centenarians